Arlindo Inacio Gouveia Colina (born 22 December 1969 in Punto Fijo, Venezuela) is a Venezuelan athlete that competed in taekwondo. He won two medals in the Pan American Games in 1987 and 1991, as well as a medal in the 1990 Pan American Taekwondo Championship. Gouveia won a gold medal in the 1992 Summer Olympics in the -54 kg category.

International awards

References

External links 
 

Venezuelan taekwondo practitioners
Taekwondo practitioners at the 1992 Summer Olympics
1969 births
Living people
Pan American Games medalists in taekwondo
Medalists at the 1987 Pan American Games
Medalists at the 1991 Pan American Games
Pan American Games gold medalists for Venezuela
Pan American Games silver medalists for Venezuela